Wildlife is a 1990 novel by American author Richard Ford.

The book is narrated by 16-year-old Joe Brinson, who watches as his parents' marriage dissolves in front of him as his mother begins an affair.

Reception
The novel received mixed reviews upon its release with The New York Times criticizing Ford's writing calling it "sententious baby talk".

Film adaptation
The novel was adapted into a film of the same name in 2018 with Paul Dano, making his directorial debut from a script he co-wrote with Zoe Kazan.

References

1990 novels
Adultery in novels
American novels adapted into films
English-language novels
Novels by Richard Ford
Novels set in Montana
Novels set in the 1960s